The Judaizers were a faction of the Jewish Christians, both of Jewish and non-Jewish origins, who regarded the Levitical laws of the Old Testament as still binding on all Christians. They tried to enforce Jewish circumcision upon the Gentile converts to early Christianity and were strenuously opposed and criticized for their behavior by the Apostle Paul, who employed many of his epistles to refute their doctrinal positions.

The term is derived from the Koine Greek word Ἰουδαΐζειν (Ioudaizein), used once in the Greek New Testament, when Paul the Apostle publicly challenged the Apostle Peter for compelling Gentile converts to early Christianity to "judaize". This episode is known as the incident at Antioch.

Most Christians believe that much of the Old Covenant has been superseded, and many believe it has been completely abrogated and replaced by the Law of Christ. The Christian debate over Judaizing began in the lifetime of the apostles, notably at the Council of Jerusalem and the incident at Antioch. It has been carried on parallel to continuing debates about Paul the Apostle and Judaism, Protestant views of the Ten Commandments, and Christian ethics.

Origin
The meaning of the verb Judaize, from which the noun Judaizer is derived, can only be derived from its various historical uses. Its biblical meaning must also be inferred and is not clearly defined beyond its obvious relationship to the word "Jew." The Anchor Bible Dictionary, for example, says: "The clear implication is that gentiles are being compelled to live according to Jewish customs."

The word Judaizer comes from Judaize, which is seldom used in English Bible translations (an exception is the Young's Literal Translation for Galatians 2:14).

In the Early Church

The Council of Jerusalem is generally dated to 48 AD, roughly 15 to 25 years after the crucifixion of Jesus, between 26 and 36 AD. Acts  and Galatians  both suggest that the meeting was called to debate whether or not male Gentiles who were converting to become followers of Jesus were required to become circumcised; the rite of circumcision was considered execrable and repulsive during the period of Hellenization of the Eastern Mediterranean, and was especially adversed in Classical civilization both from ancient Greeks and Romans, which instead valued the foreskin positively.

Before Paul's conversion, Christianity was part of Second Temple Judaism. Gentiles who wished to join the early Christian movement, which at the time comprised mostly Jewish followers, were expected to convert to Judaism, which likely meant submission to adult male circumcision for the uncircumcised, following the dietary restrictions of kashrut, and more. During the time period there were also "partial converts", such as gate proselytes and God-fearers, i.e. Greco-Roman sympathizers which made an allegiance to Judaism but refused to convert and therefore retained their Gentile (non-Jewish) status, hence they were uncircumcised and it wasn't required for them to follow any of the commandments of the Mosaic Law.

The inclusion of Gentiles into early Christianity posed a problem for the Jewish identity of some of the early Christians: the new Gentile converts were not required to be circumcised nor to observe the Mosaic Law. Circumcision in particular was regarded as a token of the membership of the Abrahamic covenant, and the most traditionalist faction of Jewish Christians (i.e., converted Pharisees) insisted that Gentile converts had to be circumcised as well. Paul insisted that faith in Christ (see also Faith or Faithfulness) was sufficient for salvation, therefore the Mosaic Law wasn't binding for the Gentiles.

New Testament

In the New Testament, the Judaizers were a group of Jewish Christians who insisted that their co-religionists should follow the Mosaic Law and that Gentile converts to Christianity must first be circumcised (i.e. become Jewish through the ritual of a proselyte). Although such repressive and legalistic requirements may have made Christianity a much less appealing religious choice for the vast majority of Gentiles, the evidence afforded in Paul's Epistle to the Galatians exhibits that, initially, a significant number of the Galatian Gentile converts appeared disposed to adopt these restrictions; indeed, Paul strenuously labors throughout the letter to dissuade them from doing so (cf.

Paul was severely critical of the Judaizers within the Early Church and harshly reprimanded them for their doctrines and behavior. Paul saw the Judaizers as being both dangerous to the spread of the Gospel and propagators of grievous doctrinal errors. Many of his letters included in the New Testament (the Pauline epistles) contain considerable material disputing the view of this faction and condemning its practitioners. Paul publicly condemned Peter for his seemingly ambivalent reaction to the Judaizers, embracing them publicly in places where their preaching was popular while holding the private opinion that their doctrines were erroneous (cf.

Paul opposed this position, concluding that Gentiles did not need to obey to the entire Law of Moses in order to become Christians. The conflict between Paul and his Judaizing opponents over this issue came to a head with the Council of Jerusalem. According to the account given in Acts , it was determined by the Great Commission that Gentile converts to Christianity did not have to go through circumcision to be saved; but in addressing the second question as to whether or not they should obey the Torah, James the Just, brother of Jesus encouraged the Gentiles to "abstain from things sacrificed to idols, and from blood, and from things strangled, and from fornication".

Paul also addressed this question in his Epistle to the Galatians, in which he condemned those who insisted that circumcision had to be followed for justification as "false believers":

Also Paul warned the early Galatian church that gentile Christians who submit to circumcision will be alienated from Christ: "Indeed I, Paul, say to you that if you become circumcised, Christ will profit you nothing. And I testify again to every man who becomes circumcised that he is a debtor to keep the whole law. You have become estranged from Christ, you who attempt to be justified by law; you have fallen from grace.".

The Catholic Encyclopedia notes: "Paul, on the other hand, not only did not object to the observance of the Mosaic Law, as long as it did not interfere with the liberty of the Gentiles, but he conformed to its prescriptions when occasion required. Thus he shortly after circumcised Timothy, and he was in the very act of observing the Mosaic ritual when he was arrested at Jerusalem ( sqq.)."

Circumcision controversy

Paul, who called himself "Apostle to the Gentiles", criticised the practice of circumcision, perhaps as an entrance into the New Covenant of Jesus. In the case of Timothy, whose mother was a Jewish Christian but whose father was a Greek, Paul personally circumcised him "because of the Jews" that were in town. In  he also disputes the value of circumcision. Paul made his case to the Christians at Rome that circumcision no longer meant the physical, but a spiritual practice. He also wrote: "Circumcision is nothing and uncircumcision is nothing. Keeping God's commands is what counts."

Later Paul more explicitly denounced the practice, rejecting and condemning those Judaizers who promoted circumcision to Gentile Christians. He accused them of turning from the Spirit to the flesh: "Are you so foolish, that, whereas you began in the Spirit, you would now be made perfect by the flesh?" Paul warned that the advocates of circumcision as a condition of salvation were "false brothers". He accused the advocates of circumcision of wanting to make a good showing in the flesh, and of glorying or boasting of the flesh. Paul instead stressed a message of salvation through faith in Christ opposed to the submission under the Mosaic Law that constituted a New Covenant with God, which essentially provides a justification for Gentiles from the harsh edicts of the Law, a New Covenant that didn't require circumcision (see also Justification by faith, Pauline passages supporting antinomianism, Abrogation of Old Covenant laws).

However, such apparent discrepancies have led to a degree of skepticism about the reliability of Acts. Some believe that Paul wrote the entire Epistle to the Galatians attacking circumcision, saying in chapter five: "Behold, I Paul say unto you, if ye be circumcised, Christ shall profit you nothing."

The division between the Jews who followed the Mosaic Law and were circumcised and the Gentiles who were uncircumcised was highlighted in his Epistle to the Galatians:

Extra-biblical sources
"Judaizer" occurs once in Josephus' Jewish War 2.18.2, referring to the First Jewish–Roman War (66-73), written around the year 75:

It occurs once in the Apostolic Fathers collection, in Ignatius's letter to the Magnesians 10:3 written around the year 100:
 There are several direct interpolations by a later forger regarding anti-Judaizing in Ignatius's epistles that are considered authentic, it can be assumed the redactor was either trying to build upon Ignatius' positions or responsible for what is perceived as Ignatius' anti-Judaizing altogether.

Judaizing teachers are strongly condemned in the Epistle of Barnabas. (Although it did not become part of the Christian Biblical canon, it was widely circulated among Christians in the first two centuries and is part of the Apostolic Fathers.) Whereas Paul acknowledged that the Law of Moses and its observance were good when used correctly ("the law is good, if one uses it lawfully"), the Epistle of Barnabas condemns most Jewish practices, claiming that Jews had grossly misunderstood and misapplied the Law of Moses.

Justin Martyr (about 140) distinguishes two kinds of Jewish Christians: those who observe the Law of Moses, but do not require its observance of others — with these he would hold communion – and those who believe the Mosaic law to be obligatory on all, whom he considers heretics (Dialogue with Trypho 47).

The Council of Laodicea of around 365 decreed 59 laws, #29:

According to Eusebius' History of the Church 4.5.3-4: the first 15 Bishops of Jerusalem were "of the circumcision", although this in all likelihood is simply stating that they were Jewish Christians (as opposed to gentile Christians), and that they observed biblical circumcision and thus likely the rest of Torah as well.

The eight homilies Adversus Judaeos ("against the Jews") of John Chrysostom (347 – 407) deal with the relationship between Christians, Jews and Judaizers.

The influence of the Judaizers in the church diminished significantly after the destruction of Jerusalem, when the Jewish-Christian community at Jerusalem was dispersed by the Romans during the First Jewish–Roman War. The Romans also dispersed the Jewish leadership in Jerusalem in 135 during the Bar Kokhba Revolt. Traditionally it is believed the Jerusalem Christians waited out the Jewish–Roman wars in Pella in the Decapolis. These setbacks however didn't necessarily mean an end to Jewish Christianity, any more than Valerian's Massacre of 258, (when he killed all Christian bishops, presbyters, and deacons, including Pope Sixtus II and Antipope Novatian and Cyprian of Carthage), meant an end to Roman Christianity.

The Latin verb iudaizare is used once in the Vulgate where the Greek verb ioudaizein occurs at Galatians 2:14. Augustine in his Commentary on Galatians, describes Paul's opposition in Galatia as those qui gentes cogebant iudaizare – "who thought to make the Gentiles live in accordance with Jewish customs."

Christian groups following Jewish practices never completely vanished, although they had been designated as heretical by the 5th century.

Later history

The Sect of Zacharias the Jew

Skhariya or Zacharias the Jew from Caffa led a sect of Judaizers in Russia. In 1480 Grand Prince Ivan III of Moscow invited some of Zacharias's prominent adherents to visit Moscow. The Judaizers enjoyed the support of high-ranking officials, of statesmen, of merchants, of Yelena Stefanovna (wife of Ivan the Young, heir to the throne) and of Ivan's favorite deacon and diplomat Fyodor Kuritsyn. The latter even decided to establish his own club in the mid-1480s. However, in the end Ivan III renounced his ideas of secularization and allied with the Orthodox Christian clergy. The struggle against the adherents was led by hegumen Joseph Volotsky and his followers (иосифляне, iosiflyane or Josephinians) and by  Archbishop Gennady of Novgorod. After uncovering adherents in Novgorod around 1487, Gennady wrote a series of letters to other churchmen over several years calling on them to convene sobors ("church councils") with the intention "not to debate them, but to burn them". Such councils took place in 1488, 1490, 1494 and 1504. The councils outlawed religious and non-religious books and initiated their burning, sentenced a number of people to death, sent adherents into exile, and excommunicated them. In 1491 Zacharias the Jew was executed in Novgorod by the order of Ivan III.

At various times since then, the Russian Orthodox Church has described several related Spiritual Christian groups as having a Judaizing character; the accuracy of this label – which was influenced by the early Christian polemics against Judaizers – has been disputed. The most famous of the Russian Empire's Judaizing sects were the Karaimites
or  Karaimizing-Subbotniks like Alexander Zaïd (1886-1938) who successfully settled in the Holy Land from 1904.

Protestantism

The Epistle to the Galatians strongly influenced Martin Luther at the time of the Protestant Reformation because of its exposition of justification by grace. Nevertheless, various sects of Messianic Jews such as Jews for Jesus have managed to stake out territory for themselves in the Protestant camp.

Inquisitions
This behavior was particularly persecuted from 1300 to 1800 during the Spanish and Portuguese Inquisitions, using as a basis the many references in the Pauline epistles regarding the "Law as a curse" and the futility of relying solely upon the Law for attaining salvation, known as legalism. Thus, in spite of Paul's agreement at the Council of Jerusalem, gentile Christianity came to understand that any Torah Laws (with the exception of the Ten Commandments) were anathema, not only to gentile Christians but also to Christians of Jewish extraction. Under the Spanish Inquisition, the penalty to a converted Jew for "Judaizing" was usually death by burning.

The Spanish word Judaizante was applied both to Jewish conversos who practiced some traditions from Judaism secretly and sometimes to Jews who had not converted, in Spain and the New World at the time of the Spanish Inquisition. 

Sometimes, accusations of being a Judaizer led to the persecution of Catholics of Converso descent who were completely innocent of preaching or doing anything heretical. For example, while serving as professor of Biblical scholarship at the University of Salamanca, the Augustinian friar and Renaissance humanism Luis de León both wrote and translated many immortal works of Christian poetry into the Spanish language. But, despite being a devout and believing Christian, Fray Luis was descended from a family of Spanish Jewish Conversos and this, as well as his vocal advocacy for teaching the Hebrew language in Catholic universities and seminaries, caused false accusations from the Dominicans of the heresies of being both a Marrano and a Judaiser. Fray Luis was accordingly imprisoned for four years by the Spanish Inquisition before he was ruled to be innocent of any wrongdoing and released without charge. While the conditions of his imprisonment were never harsh and he was allowed complete access to books, according to legend, Fray Luis started his first post-Inquisition University of Salamanca lecture with the words, "As I was saying the other day..."

According to Edith Grossman, "Fray Luis is generally considered the leading poet in the far-reaching Christianization of the Renaissance in Spain during the sixteenth-century. This means that as a consequence of the Counter-Reformation, and especially of the judgments and rulings of the Council of Trent, the secular Italianate forms and themes brought into Spain by Garcilasco were used by subsequent writers to explore moral, spiritual, and religious topics. The poets and humanists who were the followers of Fray Luis in the sixteenth-century formed the influential School of Salamanca."

The term "Judaizers" was used by the Spanish Inquisition and the inquisitions established in Mexico City, Lima, and Cartagena de Indias for Conversos (also termed Marranos) accused of continuing to observe the Jewish religion, as Crypto-Jews. Entry of Portuguese New Christians into Spain and the Spanish realms occurred during the Union of Crowns of Spain and Portugal, 1580–1640, when both kingdoms and their overseas empires were held by the same monarch. The Bnei Anusim are modern day Hispanic Judaizers.

Contemporary Christianity

The Coptic, Ethiopian and Eritrean Orthodox Churches all continue to practice male circumcision.  In Torah-submissive Christian groups which include the Ethiopian Orthodox church, dietary laws and Saturday Sabbath are observed as well.

A list of notable contemporary groups of Judaizers includes:
 Assemblies of Yahweh
 Bene Ephraim
 Black Hebrew Israelites
 Bnei Menashe
 British Israelism
 Christian Identity
 Hebrew Roots Movement
 Jews of San Nicandro
 Makuya
 Messianic Judaism 
 Sacred Name Movement
 Subbotniks
 Szekler Sabbatarians
 Yehowists

See also

 Abrahamites
 Adventism
 Seventh-day Adventist Church
 Seventh-day Adventist Interfaith Relations
 Anabaptist–Jewish relations
 Antisemitism in Christianity
 Herbert W. Armstrong
 Armstrongism
 Black Hebrew Israelites
 British Israelism
 Christian Identity
 Christianity and Judaism
 Christian–Jewish reconciliation
 Christian observances of Jewish holidays
 Christian views on the Old Covenant
 Christian Zionism
 John Chrysostom#Homilies
 Church of Christ With the Elijah Message
 Council of Jamnia
 Dual-covenant theology
 Ebionites
 Expounding of the Law
 Groups claiming affiliation with Israelites
 Catholic Church and Judaism
 Hebrew Catholics
 Hebrew Roots
 Hellenistic Judaism
 House of Joseph (LDS Church)
 Jehovah's Witnesses
 Jewish Christianity
 Jewish holidays
 Jewish religious movements
 Jewish views on religious pluralism
 Judaism and Mormonism
 Judeo-Christian
 Kashrut
 Limpieza de sangre
 List of Sabbath-keeping churches
 Makuya
 Mandaeism
 Messianic Judaism
 Josephines
 Judaism and Mormonism
 Mormonism and Christianity
 Noahidism
 Pasagians
 Philo-Semitism
 Protestantism and Judaism
 Relations between Eastern Orthodoxy and Judaism
 Restorationism
 Sabbatarianism
 Sabbath in Christianity
 Sabbath in seventh-day churches
 Sacred Name Movement
 Shabbat
 Subbotniks
 Szekler Sabbatarians
 Xueta

References

Footnotes

Bibliography

Escobar Quevedo, Ricardo. Inquisición y judaizantes en América española (siglos XVI-XVII). Bogota: Editorial Universidad del Rosario, 2008.
Márquez Villanueva. Sobre el concepto de judaizante. Tel Aviv: University Publishing Projects, 2000.

Sábado Secreto. Periodico Judaizante. OCLC Number: 174068030
Universidad de Alicante. Sobre las construcciones narrativas del "judío judaizante" ante la Inquisición. Universidad de Alicante. Departamento de Filología Española, Lingüística General y Teoría de la Literatura; Rovira Soler, José Carlos. Universidad de Alicante 2014

External links

 Catholic Encyclopedia: Judaizers
 Jewish Encyclopedia: Judaizers
 Gentiles and Circumcision

1st-century Christianity
Bible-related controversies
Christian anti-Judaism
Christian terminology
Christianity and Judaism related controversies
Early Christianity and Judaism
Judaism in the New Testament
Mosaic law in Christian theology
New Testament words and phrases
People in the Pauline epistles
Schisms in Christianity